Jorge ‘Manota’ Araúz Saucedo (born 15 November 1995) is a Bolivian footballer who plays as a goalkeeper for Bolivian Primera División side Royal Pari F.C.

Career
Araúz joined Royal Pari F.C. in December 2018 from Club Blooming for a fee of $120,000. Royal Pari had just been promoted to the Bolivian top division and were looking to reinforce their squad and initially signed him on loan for a season before making the deal permanent.

Such was his form at his new club he was awarded the “Winged Victory” award by Santa Cruz journalists for the most outstanding sportsman. He had helped his newly promoted team excel in the Bolivian Primera Division and qualify for the Copa Sudamericana as they finished the Clausara season in third place level on points with The Strongest in second.

International career
Araúz made his debut for the Bolivia national football team away at Venezuela on 10 October, 2019 in Caracas.

References

Living people
Bolivian footballers
Bolivian Primera División players
Bolivia international footballers
Association football goalkeepers
Club Blooming players
Royal Pari F.C. players
Sportspeople from Santa Cruz de la Sierra
1995 births